Walter Annicchiarico (8 March 1924 – 20 December 1991), known as Walter Chiari , was an Italian stage and screen actor, mostly in comedy roles.

Biography
Walter Annicchiarico was born in Verona, Italy on 8 March 1924 to a family originally from Apulia. During World War II he joined the Decima Flottiglia MAS, and then the Wehrmacht. Chiari appeared in films such as The Little Hut (1957), Bonjour Tristesse (1958), Chimes at Midnight (1966), and The Valachi Papers (1972). He appeared opposite Anna Magnani in Luchino Visconti's film Bellissima (1951).

In 1951 Luchino Visconti offered him the role of the young lover, in Bellissima; he continued in the theater, in the musical comedy with Delia Scala in 1956 with Buonanotte Bettina and in 1958 with Il gufo e la gattina, and in 1960 with Sandra Mondaini, Ave Ninchi and Alberto Bonucci with Un mandarino per Teo, all by Garinei and Giovannini, but also in the prose theater, acting in 1961 in The Gay Life, in 1965 with Gianrico Tedeschi in the comedy Luv by Murray Schisgal and, in 1966, with Renato Rascel in La strana coppia by Neil Simon.

During the making of The Little Hut he met Ava Gardner (still married to Frank Sinatra but already estranged from him), and he started a relationship with the American superstar.

He starred in They're a Weird Mob (1966), the last of the Powell and Pressburger films, based on a popular Australian novel by John O'Grady. His then girlfriend, Italian singer and actress Alida Chelli, also appeared in the film; the two married in 1969, and had one son, television presenter Simone Annicchiarico, before their 1972 divorce. He also appeared in the Australian film Squeeze a Flower in 1970.

In 1970 he was arrested and jailed in Rome on suspicion of cocaine possession and trafficking.  After his release and partial acquittal (he was deemed not guilty of the trafficking count and received a lenient sentence for the charge of drug possession for personal use) his career never recovered. The Italian state television was off-limits for him, and all he could aspire to were bit parts in low-key comedies and local television appearances, and on theatre.

Chiari died of a sudden heart attack in Milan, at home, on 21 December 1991. His gravestone bears the line he once mentioned to director Dino Risi as his favourite choice for an epitaph: "Don't worry, I'm merely catching up with sleep". His grave is in the Civico Mausoleo Palanti in the Cimitero Monumentale di Milano.

Filmography

Vanity (directed by Giorgio Pàstina) (1947)
Toto Tours Italy (directed by Mario Mattòli) (1948) as Bruno
Che tempi! (directed by Giorgio Bianchi) (1948) as Eugenio Devoto
The Elusive Twelve (directed by Mario Mattoli) (1950) as Carletto Esposito / Brandoletti
 The Cadets of Gascony (directed by Mario Mattòli) (1950) as Walter Mantoni
 That Ghost of My Husband (directed by Camillo Mastrocinque) (1950) as Gianni Alberti
Abbiamo vinto! (directed by Robert Stemmle) (1951) as Giorgio Silvestri
Arrivano i nostri (directed by Mario Mattòli) (1951) as Walter Introcci, l'autista
 It's Love That's Ruining Me (directed by Mario Soldati) (1951) as Walter Palaccioni
O.K. Nerone (directed by Mario Soldati) (1951) as Fiorello Capone
 The Steamship Owner (directed by Mario Mattòli) (1951) as himself
Era lui... sì! sì! (directed by Metz and Marchesi) (1951) as Walter Milani
Bellissima (directed by Luchino Visconti) (1951) as Alberto Annovazzi
 Sardinian Vendetta (directed by Mario Mattòli) (1952) as Gualtiero Porchiddu
The Dream of Zorro (directed by Mario Soldati) (1952) as Don Raimundo Esteban
Cinque poveri in automobile (directed by Mario Mattòli) (1952) as Paolo
L'ora della verità (directed by Jean Delannoy) (1952) as Un client du cabaret
Noi due soli (directed by Marino Girolami) (1952) as Walter
 Poppy (directed by Vittorio Metz and Marcello Marchesi) (1952) as Gualtiero / Walter
Viva il cinema! (directed by Giorgio Baldaccini and Enzo Trapani) (1952)
 It Was She Who Wanted It! (directed by Marino Girolami and Giorgio Simonelli) (1953) as Walter Martini
Cinema d'altri tempi (directed by Steno) (1953) as Marcello Serventi
Viva la rivista! (directed by Enzo Trapani) (1953)
Siamo tutti Milanesi (directed by Mario Landi) (1953)
What Scoundrels Men Are! (directed by Glauco Pellegrini) (1953) as Bruno
A Day in Court (directed by Steno) (1954) as Don Michele
Questa è la vita (directed by Aldo Fabrizi) (1954) as Il commissario (segment "Marsina stretta")
Gran varietà (directed by Domenico Paolella) (1954)
Avanzi di galera (directed by Vittorio Cottafavi) (1954) as Giuseppe Rasi
It Happened at the Police Station (directed by Giorgio Simonelli) (1954) as Luigi Giovetti
Vacanze d'amore (directed by Jean-Paul Le Chanois) (1955) as Momo
Nanà (directed by Christian-Jaque) (1955) as Fontan
Je suis un sentimental (directed by John Berry) (1955) as Dédé la Couleuvre
Accadde al penitenziario (directed by Giorgio Bianchi) (1955) as Walter Polacchi
Io piaccio (directed by Giorgio Bianchi) (1955) as Professor Roberto Maldi
Red and Black (directed by Domenico Paolella) (1955)
Mio zio Giacinto (directed by Ladislao Vajda) (1956) as Caballero elegante
Donatella (directed by Mario Monicelli) (1956) as Guido
Wives and Obscurities (directed by Leonardo De Mitri) (1956) as Frank Cattabriga, suo figlio
The Little Hut (directed by Mark Robson) (1957) as Mario
Bonjour tristesse, directed by Otto Preminger (1958) as Pablo
Festa di maggio (directed by Luis Saslavsky) (1958) as Gilbert
Amore a priva vista (directed by Franco Rossi) (1958) as Luigi
I zitelloni (directed by Giorgio Bianchi) (1958) as Marcello
La ragazza di piazza San Pietro (directed by Piero Costa) (1958) as Roberto Gradi
 The Friend of the Jaguar (directed by Giuseppe Bennati) (1959) as Augusto
Parque de Madrid (directed by Enrique Cahen Salaberry) (1959) as Alberto
Lui, lei and il nonno (directed by Anton Giulio Majano) (1959) as Eugenio
Le sorprese dell'amore (directed by Luigi Comencini) (1960) as Ferdinando Aloisi
I baccanali di Tiberio (directed by Giorgio Simonelli) (1960) as Cassio, the Cicerone
Vacanze in Argentina (directed by Guido Leoni) (1960) as Il barista
Un mandarino per Teo (directed by Mario Mattòli) (1960) as Teo Tosci
Femmine di lusso (directed by Giorgio Bianchi) (1960) as Walter
Un dollaro di fifa (directed by Giorgio Simonelli) (1960) as Mike
Ferragosto in bikini (directed by Marino Girolami) (1960) as 'Harold' Pasquale Esposito
Caccia al marito (directed by Marino Girolami) as Himself
La moglie di mio marito (directed by Tony Roman) (1961) as Giulio
Bellezze sulla spiaggia (directed by Romolo Girolami) (1961) as Walter Crocci
Walter and i suoi cugini (directed by Marino Girolami) (1961) as Walter Colasuonno / Rosario Colasuonno / Nicola Colasuonno
Mariti a congresso (directed by Luigi Filippo D'Amico) (1961)
La ragazza sotto il lenzuolo (directed by Marino Girolami) (1961) as Bruno
I magnifici tre (directed by Giorgio Simonelli) (1961) as Pablo
Copacabana Palace (directed by Steno) (1962) as Ugo
I motorizzati (directed by Camillo Mastrocinque) (1962) as Valentino
Due contro tutti (directed by Alberto De Martino and Antonio Momplet) (1962) as Bull Bullivan
Gli Italiani and le donne (directed by Marino Girolami) (1962) as Renato Nelli (segment "L'Abito non fa il Monaco")
Il giorno più corto (directed by Sergio Corbucci) (1963) as L'avvocato difensore
L'attico (directed by Gianni Puccini) (1963) as Gabriele
La rimpatriata (directed by Damiano Damiani) (1963) as Cesarino
Obiettivo ragazze (directed by Mario Mattòli) (1963) as Antonio Zanelli
Le motorizzate (directed by Marino Girolami) (1963) as Walter (segment "La Signora Ci Marcia")
Gli imbroglioni (directed by Lucio Fulci) (1963) as Dr. Corti (segment "Medico e fidanzata")
Gli onorevoli (directed by Sergio Corbucci) (1963) as Salvatore Dagnino
Follie d'estate (directed by Carlo Infascelli and Edoardo Anton) (1963) as uomo della 'Vanoni'
La donna degli altri è sempre più bella (directed by Marino Girolami) (1963) as Walter, il bagnino (segment "Bagnino lover")
Gli eroi del West (directed by Steno) (1964) as Mike
Il giovedì (directed by Dino Risi) (1964) as Dino Versini
Se permettete, parliamo di donne (directed by Ettore Scola) (1964) as Philanderer
I maniaci (directed by Lucio Fulci) (1964) as The Sicilian hitchhiker (segment "L'autostop") / Car driver (segment "Il sorpasso") / Pasquale Taddei (segment "La protesta") / Client of Night-clubs (segment "Lo strip")
I gemelli del Texas (directed by Steno) (1964) as Ezechiel / Joe
Le tardone (directed by Marino Girolami and Javier Setó) (1964) as Bortolo Masteghin (episode "40 ma non li dimostra")
Här kommer bärsärkarna (directed by Arne Mattsson) (1965) as Pollo
The Sucker (directed by Gérard Oury) (1965) (uncredited)
Thrilling (directed by Gian Luigi Polidoro) (1965) as Bertazzi (segment "Sadik")
Falstaff (directed by Orson Welles) (1965) as Mr. Silence
Made in Italy (directed by Nanni Loy) (1965) as Enrico (segment "1 'Usi e costumi', episode 3")
Io, io, io... e gli altri (directed by Alessandro Blasetti) (1966) as Sandro
Ischia operazione amore (directed by Vittorio Sala) (1966) as Enrico Laterra - aka Trema la terra
They're a Weird Mob (aka Sono strana gente) (directed by Michael Powell) (1966) as Nino Culotta
Amore all'italiana (directed by Steno) (1966) as Il venditore di uova / Antonio / Flavio / 007 / Il viaggiatore / Roberto Matrasso
 The Most Beautiful Couple in the World (directed by Camillo Mastrocinque) (1968) as Walter
Capriccio all'italiana (directed by Mauro Bolognini) (1968) as Paolo (segment "Gelosa, La")
Quei temerari sulle loro pazze, scatenate, scalcinate carriole (directed by Ken Annakin) (1969) as Angelo
Squeeze a Flower (directed by Marc Daniels) (1970) as Brother George
The Valachi Papers (Italian title: Joe Valachi - I segreti di Cosa Nostra) (directed by Terence Young (1972), produced by Jerry Ferraro) as Gap
Amore mio, non farmi male (directed by Vittorio Sindoni) (1974) as Paolo De Simone
Zig Zag (directed by László Szabó) (1975) as Walter, le clochard
Son tornate a fiorire le rose (directed by Vittorio Sindoni) (1975) as Paolo De Simone
La banca di Monate (directed by Francesco Massaro) (1975) as Ragionier Adelmo Pigorini
Per amore di Cesarina (directed by Vittorio Sindoni) (1976) as Davide Camporesi
Passi furtivi in una notte boia (directed by Vincenzo Rigo) (1976) as Pompeo Piretti
Come ti rapisco il pupo (directed by Lucio De Caro) (1976) as Sterzi - Jimmy's father
La bidonata (directed by Luciano Ercoli) (1977) as Renato
Ride bene... chi ride ultimo (directed by Walter Chiari) (1977) as Loris Martegani (segment "Prete per forza")
Tanto va la gatta al lardo... (directed by Marco Aleandri) (1978) as Teodoro Casadei
Ridendo and scherzando (directed by Marco Aleandri) (1978) as Giorgio
Belli and brutti ridono tutti (directed by Domenico Paolella) (1979) as Don Enzo
Tre sotto il lenzuolo (directed by Paolo Dominici) (1979) as Giorgio Mori (segment "No, non è per gelosia")
Romance (directed by Massimo Mazzucco (1986) and produced by Jerry Ferraro) as Giulio
Kafka la colonia penale (directed by Giuliano Betti) (1988)
Tracce di vita amorosa (directed by Peter Del Monte) (1990) as Giorgio (final film role)

References

External links
 
 

1924 births
1991 deaths
Actors from Verona
Italian male stage actors
Italian comedians
Italian television personalities
Burials at the Cimitero Monumentale di Milano
Italian male film actors
20th-century Italian male actors
20th-century Italian comedians
People of Apulian descent
Mass media people from Verona
Regia Marina personnel of World War II
German military personnel of World War II